Kherson International Airport is a civil and military airport serving the city of Kherson, Ukraine. It is located at Chornobaivka, in Kherson Oblast, on the north-west outskirts of the city of Kherson.

Airlines and destinations
As of 24 February 2022, all passenger flights at Kherson have been suspended indefinitely. The following airlines previously operated regular scheduled and charter flights at the airport.

Statistics

Kherson Air Base 

The base, also known as the Chornobaivka airfield, was home to the 11th Separate Army Aviation Regiment of the Ukrainian Army Aviation.

It was one of the Ukrainian air bases attacked early in the 2022 Russian invasion of Ukraine. The Russian forces took over the airbase in the course of the battle of Kherson on 2 March 2022, and setup a command post there, which was targeted by the Ukrainian military several times since then. On 16 March, Ukraine launched an airstrike against Russian forces at the airbase, destroying at least seven helicopters and a number of vehicles. Ukrainian officials claimed the attacks killed two high-ranking Russian commanders, generals Andrey Mordvichev and Yakov Rezantsev. On 23 March, the Ukrainian media cited satellite imagery showing that most of the Russian military aircraft had been removed from the airfield, but the troops remained on the ground.

Ukrainian attacks against Russian forces extended up to 5 November, and on 11 November, Chornobaivka and the airport were liberated by the Ukrainian Armed Forces. Russian forces left in the area what has been described as "a huge minefield and a graveyard of Russian weapons, vehicles and personnel".

See also
 List of airports in Ukraine
 List of the busiest airports in Ukraine
 List of the busiest airports in Europe
 List of the busiest airports in the former USSR
 Transportation in Ukraine

References

External links
 Official website

Airports in Ukraine
Airports built in the Soviet Union
Chornobaivka
Military installations of Ukraine
Ukrainian airbases
Russian Air Force bases